Richard Gasquet was the defending champion, but withdrew before the tournament began. 
Marin Čilić won the title, defeating Roberto Bautista Agut in the final, 6–4, 6–4.

Seeds
The first four seeds received a bye into the second round.

Draw

Finals

Top half

Bottom half

Qualifying

Seeds

Qualifiers

Qualifying draw

First qualifier

Second qualifier

Third qualifier

Fourth qualifier

References
 Main Draw
 Qualifying Draw

Kremlin Cup - Singles
2014 Men's Singles